{
  "type": "FeatureCollection",
  "features": [
    {
      "type": "Feature",
      "properties": {},
      "geometry": {
        "type": "Point",
        "coordinates": [
          -90.00008583068849,
          32.358684516465324
        ]
      }
    }
  ]
}
Northwest Rankin High School is a suburban public high school located in Flowood, Mississippi, United States. The school serves grades 9-12 and is part of the Rankin County School District.  The school's attendance was approximately 1,700 students as of the 2018 campus census.

Plans for the construction for a new high school in between the current campus and the campus of Northwest Rankin Middle School were approved by the Rankin Country School District board. It is expected to be completed by the start of the 2021–2022 school year. Funding for this project was approved by the District's bond issue.

Academics 
Northwest Rankin offers Pre-Advanced Placement (Pre-AP) and Advanced Placement (AP) courses in English, Math, Science, and Social Studies.  In addition, there are five four-year academic specializations (referred to as academies) offered in addition to several dual enrollment courses with Hinds Community College.

Academies 
The academic specializations include the health science nursing academy, engineering academy, convergent media academy, educational leadership academy, and JROTC.  All of these academies are four year programs that the student can receive an endorsement in upon graduation.

Classes 
In addition to pre-AP courses, several AP courses are also offered, including AP Art, AP US History, AP US Government, AP English Literature, AP English Language, AP Spanish, AP French, AP Physics 1, AP Chemistry, AP Calculus AB, and AP Statistics.  Dual credit courses including DC Algebra I, DC Algebra II, DC Biology I, DC Biology II, DC Composition I, DC Composition II, and DC Public Speaking are offered.

Student body

Demographics 
As of the 2018-2019 school year, the school had an attendance of 1706 students.

Matriculation statistics 
In the typical graduating class, 70% of all students attend a 2- or 4-year college or university, with 20% joining the workforce and 10% joining active US military service. From the 2017 graduating class, the estimated total scholarship award to national colleges and universities amounted to $110 million.

Clubs and organizations 

Northwest Rankin hosts several extracurricular activities for its students, covering several areas of academic, leadership, and cultural interests.

Student government 
A yearly committee is elected by the student population.  The government is divided into executive positions (campus-wide representation) and class positions (Grade 10, 11, or 12 Representation).  All positions have one seat available; the noteworthy exception is the co-president position, which has two seats.

Executive positions:

 Co-President (2)
 Vice President (1)
 Secretary (1)
 Treasurer (1)
Reporter (1)

Class positions:

 Co-President (2)
 Vice President (1)
 Secretary (1)
 Treasurer (1)
Class Representative (1)

Band 
The Northwest band received many accolades, including receiving all honors Lions Band, the highest honor given to secondary bands in the state of Mississippi.  In addition, many of its students have been selected to chairs in the state band.

HOSA:  Future Health Professionals 
The Northwest chapter of HOSA:  Future Health Professionals was charted in 2015 and was the flagship program in the Rankin County district.  With the majority of its members also being health science nursing academy students, competitive skills are incorporated into the curriculum, with one day of every week dedicated to developing skills for competition.  Several students have competed successfully at the international level and have placed Top 10 in several individual or team events.  Notably, students have placed first in CPR first aid, second in medical terminology, and fifth in pathophysiology.  In 2016, a student was elected Mississippi HOSA state president.

Athletics 

Northwest offers a wide range of athletic extracurricular activities, in which most events have both women's and men's teams.  The campus features a football, soccer, track, and softball field, in addition to several auxiliary outdoor athletic facilities.

Awards and recognition 

Northwest Rankin has received many awards and recognition over the years.  They include the following:

 Ranked #2 in the Jackson, MS metro area schools
STAR school status
An "A" secondary education rating in 2016, with a rating of "B" in previous years

Within the Rankin County district, Northwest Rankin has been acknowledged for the following achievements:

 Ranked #1 in the district
School with the most students scoring 30+ on the ACT
 School with the most National Merit Finalists

School Feeder Pattern 
Northwest Rankin High School is part of a larger primary/secondary education feeder pattern.

Elementary schools
 Northwest Rankin Elementary School
 Northshore Elementary School
 Oakdale Elementary School
 Highland Bluff Elementary School
 Flowood Elementary School
Middle schools
 Northwest Rankin Middle School
High school
Northwest Rankin High School

References

Educational institutions in the United States with year of establishment missing
Public high schools in Mississippi
Schools in Rankin County, Mississippi